Romain Thibault (born 6 January 1991 in Nîmes) is a French footballer who plays as a forward for French club Entente Perrier Vergeze.

Career statistics

References

External links
Romain Thibault career statistics at foot-national.com

French footballers
1991 births
Living people
Footballers from Nîmes
Association football forwards
Nîmes Olympique players
Football Bourg-en-Bresse Péronnas 01 players
Les Herbiers VF players
Hyères FC players
FC Martigues players
FC Sète 34 players
Ligue 2 players
Championnat National players
Championnat National 2 players
Championnat National 3 players